Petrushino is a rural locality (a village) in Kochyovskoye Rural Settlement, Kochyovsky District, Perm Krai, Russia. The population was 6 as of 2010. There is 1 street.

Geography 
Petrushino is located 11 km southwest of Kochyovo (the district's administrative centre) by road. Lobozovo is the nearest rural locality.

References 

Rural localities in Kochyovsky District